500 may refer to:

 500 (number)
 500 BC
 AD 500

Buildings and places
 500 Boylston Street of Boston
 500 Brickell in Miami
 500 Capitol Mall in Sacramento
 500 Fifth Avenue
 500 Renaissance Center, one of seven buildings in the GM Renaissance Center in Detroit, Michigan
 Tin Wing stop, Hong Kong (station code)

Currency
 500 kroner note, a 1972 Danish banknote
 500 kroner note, a 1997 Danish banknote
 500 Krooni, an Estonian banknote
 500 kronur note, an Icelandic banknote
 500 kroner note, a Norwegian banknote
 500 kronor note, a Swedish banknote
 500 yen coin, a Japanese coin
 500 euro note, a Euro banknote

Electronics
 Amiga 500, a home computer
 Amiga 500 Plus, a home computer
 Lenovo IdeaPad 500, a discontinued brand of notebook computers, same as Lenovo's IdeaPad 300
 Lenovo Yoga 500, a 2-in-1 PC
 Model 500 telephone

Games

Ball games
 500 (ball game), a ball game for children

Card games
 500 (card game) based on Euchre
 500 Rum, a variant of the rummy card game

Video games
 500cc Grand Prix, a computer came on Atari ST
 Indy 500 (arcade game)
 Indy 500 (1995 video game)

Lists
 Deloitte Fast 500
 Forbes 500
 Fortune 500
 Fortune Global 500
 S&P 500
 NME's The 500 Greatest Albums of All Time
 Rolling Stone's 500 Greatest Albums of All Time
 The 500 Greatest Songs of All Time, by Rolling Stone magazine
 The Rock and Roll Hall of Fame's 500 Songs that Shaped Rock and Roll

Media
 500 Days of Summer
 500mg, a solo project of Michael Gibbons of the band Bardo Pond
 500 (Shake Baby Shake), a song by Lush from their album Lovelife

Military
 500 Brigade, the Israeli Armor Corps 
 500th Air Refueling Wing
 500th SS Parachute Battalion

Roads and routes
 List of 500-series county routes in New Jersey
 500 series bus routes, Sydney
 Bundesstraße 500
 Florida State Road 500
 U.S. 500

Sports

Baseball
 500 home run club

Cycling
 500 meter track time trial

Motorsports
 500cc, a subdivision of the MotoGP class in Grand Prix motorcycle racing
 500 km Zeltweg, an Austrian racing event
 Adelaide 500
 Atlanta 500
 Daytona 500
 Food City 500
 Indy 500
 Los Angeles Times 500
 Monza 500 (Race of Two Worlds)
 Phillip Island 500
 Queensland 500
 Sandown 500
 Wellington 500

Vehicles

Aircraft
 Cessna 500, an eight-seat business jet
 Eclipse 500, a small six-seat business jet

Automobiles
 Denza 500, a German-Chinese compact electric hatchback
 Fiat 500, an lineup of Italian small cars
 Fiat 500 Topolino (1936–1955)
 Fiat 500 (1957–1975)
 Fiat Cinquecento (1991–1998)
 Fiat 500 (2007) (2007–2020)
 Fiat New 500 (2020–present)
 Ford Five Hundred, an American full-size sedan
 Lexus LC 500, a Japanese sports coupe
 Lexus LC 500 GT500, a racing variant of the LC 500
 Mercedes-Benz 500, a series of German luxury cars

Trains
 500 Series Shinkansen, a series of railroad trains operated by West Japan Railway Company

Weapons

Guns
 Mossberg 500, a shotgun
 Smith & Wesson Model 500, a revolver
 Ultimate 500, a revolver

Gun cartridges
 .500 Black Powder Express (rifle)
 .500 S&W Magnum (revolver)
 .500 Linebaugh (revolver)
 .500 Maximum (revolver)
 .500 Nitro Express (rifle)
 .500 S&W Special (revolver)
 .500 Wyoming Express (revolver)

Other
 500 Internal Server Error, an HTTP response code 
 500 kHz (or 500 kc), a radio frequency
 500 year flood, a type of flood level
International calling code for the Falkland Islands
The 500 (I Cinquecento), the 500 Italian soldiers killed at the Battle of Dogali, 1887

See also 
 500 series (disambiguation)
 500s (disambiguation)